The Football Federation was formed only in 1947. During the years between 1947 and 1950. The only leagues in the developed in regional. The first States and Divisions Football Tournament was held in 1952.

States and Regions

Results

Football in Myanmar